Sándor Matus (born 31 October 1976) is a Hungarian former footballer who played as a goalkeeper.

Career

In 1999, Matus signed for Finnish side KTP. Before the second half of 1999–00, he signed for Pécs in the Hungarian top flight, where he made over 26 league appearances and scored 0 goals. Before the 2003 season, Matus signed for Finnish second tier club RoPS.

Before the 2004 season, he signed for KA in the Icelandic top flight, where he suffered relegation to the Icelandic second tier and helped them reach the 2004 Icelandic Cup final. Before the 2017 season, Matus signed for Icelandic fourth tier team Dalvík/Reynir. In 2020, he signed for ÍH in the Icelandic fifth tier.

References

External links
 Sándor Matus at playmakerstats.com

1. deild karla players
3. deild karla players
1976 births
Association football goalkeepers
Dalvík/Reynir players
Expatriate footballers in Finland
Expatriate footballers in Iceland
FC Jazz players
Fehérvár FC players
Gázszer FC footballers
Hungarian expatriate footballers
Hungarian expatriate sportspeople in Finland
Hungarian expatriate sportspeople in Iceland
Hungarian footballers
Knattspyrnufélag Akureyrar players
Kotkan Työväen Palloilijat players
Living people
Nemzeti Bajnokság I players
Pécsi MFC players
Rovaniemen Palloseura players
Þór Akureyri players
Úrvalsdeild karla (football) players
Veikkausliiga players
Ykkönen players